Bomb Girls is a Canadian television drama that profiles the stories of four women working in a Canadian munitions factory during World War II, beginning in 1941.

ACTRA Awards

Canadian Cinema Editors Awards

Canadian Screen Awards

Bomb Girls: Facing the Enemy

Directors Guild of Canada Awards

Bomb Girls: Facing the Enemy

Gracie Allen Awards

Leo Awards

Bomb Girls: Facing the Enemy

Golden Nymph Awards

References

Bomb Girls